Darren Chyer (born 28 July 1966) is an Australian cricketer. He played one first-class match for South Australia in 1988/89.

See also
 List of South Australian representative cricketers

References

External links
 

1966 births
Living people
Australian cricketers
South Australia cricketers
Cricketers from Adelaide